The Yangpingguan–Ankang railway or Yang'an railway, is a single-track, electrified railroad in China between Yangpingguan and Ankang in southern Shaanxi Province.  The line,  in length, follows the upper reaches of the Han River and was built from 1969 to 1972.  Major cities and towns along route include Yangpingguan, Mian County, Hanzhong, Chenggu, Yang County, Xixiang, Shiquan, Hanyin and Ankang.

History
The Yang'an railway was the second electrified railway to be built in China.  The railway was built through rugged terrain under dangerous conditions.  Some 384 workers died from accidents, an average of more than one fatality per kilometer built.

In 2009, a second track was planned to expand the line's capacity. In 2014, a second line with two-tracks 329 km in length was approved by the National Development and Reform Commission.

Rail connections
Yangpingguan: Baoji–Chengdu railway
Hanzhong: Xi'an–Chengdu high-speed railway
Ankang: Xiangyang–Chongqing railway, Xi'an–Ankang railway

See also

 List of railways in China

References

External links

Railway lines in China
Rail transport in Shaanxi
Railway lines opened in 1972